Rama is a municipality and a city in the South Caribbean Coast Autonomous Region of Nicaragua.

It is located along the Bluefields River which branches off into three other rivers: the Sumi, Rama, and Bluefields. It is home to an important Atlantic/Caribbean port. The municipality has a population of 58,896 (2021 estimate).

History

Rama is an old settlement, whose name is reminiscent of their first settlers, the Caribbean indigenous Rama, once populate the territories of the present municipalities of Bluefields and Rama. Unlike the Miskito, this ethnic group did not subordinated to the British and other European nations from 1633. Ethnicity also fought pirates and Spanish conquistadors who sought to enslave during the conquest.

The municipality increased its importance in the late nineteenth century, with the beginning of the extraction of timber, rubber and banana enclave by US companies. This economic activation caused a strong flow from other parts of the country as well as citizens of Chinese origin, who were primarily devoted to trade. The construction of the Managua-Rama highway facilitated successive waves of migration of peasants

Settlements
There are a total of 98 communities: among which we can to mention:
Other minor places, but with a tendency to develop as villages, are: El Recreo, El Colorado, El Pavon, Aguas Calientes, Maria Cristina Gaitan, Magnolia, Las Iguanas, El Pedregal, La Union, El Arene, El Castillo and St Geronimo.

Twin cities
 Maastricht, Netherlands

See also
Rama people
  Facebook Page

References

Municipalities of the South Caribbean Coast Autonomous Region